Sophie Basenga Kadima (born 9 September 1993), known as Sophie Basenga, is a DR Congolese footballer who plays as a forward. She has been a member of the DR Congo women's national team.

International career
Basenga capped for the DR Congo at senior level during the 2012 African Women's Championship.

See also
 List of Democratic Republic of the Congo women's international footballers

References

1993 births
Living people
Women's association football forwards
Democratic Republic of the Congo women's footballers
Democratic Republic of the Congo women's international footballers